This is a list of air shows in Japan. Air shows in Japan are mostly those held at Japan Air Self-Defense Force and US military bases across the country. Air shows are sometimes known as festivals in Japan.

The Japan Air Self-Defense Force, (JASDF) Japan Ground Self-Defense Force (JGSDF) and Japan Maritime Self-Defense Force (MSDF) all have air shows at their bases. Air shows or open days are also held at a number of US military bases in Japan. At JASDF base air shows it is common for the Blue Impulse aerobatic team to perform.

The US Air Force, US Marine Corps, and US Navy also have events at their bases. Visitors who are not from the US or Japan may be turned away from a US base for security reasons. Prospective attendees of events at US bases who are neither Japanese or American should bring identification and also consult the Third Country National list to see if they require special approval to enter the base.

Individual event dates can vary or be cancelled during different years. The months given below are the 2016 months. For current dates see here.

JASDF

 March - Komaki Air Show
 April - Kumagaya Air Show
 May - Hofu-Kita Air Show
 May - Miho Air Show
 July - Chitose Air Show
 September - Misawa Air Show (also a US Air Force base)
 September - Komatsu Air Show
 September  - Akita Air Show
 September - Shizuhama Air Show
 October - Ashiya Air Show
 October - Hamamatsu Air Show
 October - Gifu Air Show
 November 3 Culture Day - Iruma Air Show
 November - Kasuga Air Show
 November - Hyakuri Air Show
 November - Tsuiki Air Show
 December - Nyutabaru Air Show
 December - Naha Air Show (also a US Air Force base)

JGSDF

 April - Somagahara Air Show
 April - Takayubaru Air Show
 April - Metabaru Air Show
 April - Kasuminome Air Show
 April - Hachinohe Air Show
 April - Narashino Air Show
 June - Kasumigaura Air Show
 June - Asahikawa Air Show
 June - Kita-Utsunomiya Air Show
 June - Okadama Air Show
 September - Obihiro Air Show
 October - Tachikawa Air Show (also heliport for the Tokyo Fire Department and Tokyo Metropolitan Police Department)
 October - Akeno Air Show
 October - Yao Air Show
 October - Naha Air Show

JMSDF

 April - Kanoya Air Show
 April - Atsugi Air Show (also a US Navy base)
 May - Iwakuni Air Show (also a US Marine Corps base)
 May - Omura Air Show
 June - Ohminato Air Show
 July - Maizuru Air Show
 July - Komatsushima Air Show
 July - Kobe-Hanshin Air Show
 July - Tateyama Air Show 
 September - Hachinohe Air Show 
 September - Tokushima Air Show 
 October - Ozuki Air Show  (“Swell Festival”)
 October - Shimofusa Air Show

US Air Force

 September - Yokota Air Base friendship festival
 September - Misawa Air Show (also a JASDF base)
 December - Naha Air Show (also a JASDF base)

US Marine Corps
 May - Iwakuni Air Show (also a JMSDF base)

US Navy

 April - Atsugi Air Show (also a JMSDF base)

Other
 November - Fly Again Tsuchiura

References

J
Air s j
Aviation in Japan